Angaeus is a genus of Asian crab spiders first described by Tamerlan Thorell in 1881. It is considered a senior synonym of Paraborboropactus.

Species
 it contained twelve species, found in Asia:
Angaeus canalis (Tang & Li, 2010) – China
Angaeus christae Benjamin, 2013 – Borneo
Angaeus comatulus Simon, 1909 – Vietnam
Angaeus lenticulosus Simon, 1903 – China, Vietnam
Angaeus liangweii (Tang & Li, 2010) – China
Angaeus pentagonalis Pocock, 1901 – India (mainland, Andaman Is.)
Angaeus pudicus Thorell, 1881 (type) – Indonesia (Moluccas, Seram Island)
Angaeus rhombifer Thorell, 1890 – China, Myanmar, Vietnam, Malaysia, Singapore, Indonesia (Sumatra), Borneo
Angaeus rhombus (Tang & Li, 2009) – China
Angaeus verrucosus Benjamin, 2017 – Malaysia (Borneo)
Angaeus xieluae (Liu, 2022) – China
Angaeus zhengi (Tang & Li, 2009) – China

See also
 List of Thomisidae species

References

Further reading

Thomisidae
Thomisidae genera
Spiders of Asia
Taxa named by Tamerlan Thorell